Pedro Miguel Gomes Delgado (born 7 April 1997) is a professional footballer who plays as a midfielder for Chinese Super League club Shandong Luneng. Delgado formerly represented Portugal internationally, before gaining Chinese citizenship.

Football career
On 28 August 2016, Delgado joined Primeira Liga side Sporting from Inter Milan as part of João Mário's transfer deal. On 11 September 2016, Delgado made his professional debut with Sporting B in a 2016–17 LigaPro match against Varzim. After two seasons Delgado joined Chinese Super League side Shandong Luneng on 1 August 2018 for €800,000. He would fail to register for official matches in the 2018 season due to the foreign player limit. He would eventually gain clearance to play the following season and on 30 June 2019 he made his debut in a league game against Beijing Guoan in a 2-0 victory. 

On 1 February 2020, Delgado joined Primeira Liga club Aves on loan until the end of 2019–20 season. On his return to Shandong he would be part of the squad that won the 2021 Chinese Super League title. While he would gain Chinese citizenship, he would not meet the requirements as a domestic player by the Chinese Football Association and was loaned out to second tier club Kunshan on 26 August 2022. He would go on to establish himself as regular within the team and was part of the squad that won the division and promotion to the top tier at the end of the 2022 China League One campaign.

Personal life
Born and raised in Portimão, Portugal, Delgado's father Amilcar Delgado was a Cape Verdean former footballer. Delgado gained Chinese citizenship in 2019. He has no Chinese ancestry.

Career statistics
.

Honours

Club
Shandong Taishan
Chinese Super League: 2021
Chinese FA Cup: 2021
Kunshan
 China League One: 2022

See also
List of Chinese naturalized footballers

References

External links

Stats and profile at LPFP 
National team data 

1997 births
Living people
People from Portimão
Portuguese footballers
Portugal youth international footballers
Portugal under-21 international footballers
Chinese footballers
Portuguese emigrants to China
Chinese people of Portuguese descent
Chinese people of Cape Verdean descent
Sportspeople of Cape Verdean descent
Portuguese sportspeople of Cape Verdean descent
Association football midfielders
Expatriate footballers in Italy
Liga Portugal 2 players
Sporting CP B players
Chinese Super League players
Shandong Taishan F.C. players
Naturalized citizens of the People's Republic of China
Sportspeople from Faro District